The River Nith (Common Brittonic: Nowios) is a river in south-west Scotland. For the majority of its  course it flows in a south-easterly direction through Dumfries and Galloway and then into the Solway Firth at Airds Point.

Length

For estuaries the principle followed is that the river should be visible at all times. The measurement therefore follows the centre of the river at low tide and the mouth of the river is assumed to be at the coastal high tide mark. In Scotland this does not generally make a significant difference, except for rivers draining into shallow sloping sands of the Irish Sea and Solway Firth, notably the Nith. At low tide, the sea recedes to such an extent that the length of the Nith is extended by 13 km to 113.8 km (70.7 miles), making it Scotland's seventh longest river.

Protected areas
The estuary of the River Nith is an internationally important winter feeding site for waders, geese and other wildfowl, and is for this reason protected at an international level as part of the Upper Solway Flats and Marshes Ramsar site and Special Protection Area. The SPA supports virtually the entire Svalbard population of barnacle geese during winter.

The area also forms part of the Solway Firth Special Area of Conservation, which is protected due to the presence of several priority habitats, and as well as populations of sea lamprey and river lamprey. At a national level, the area is a Site of Special Scientific Interest and is within the Caerlaverock National Nature Reserve.

The Nith Estuary National Scenic Area recognises the scenic value of the area. It is one of 40 such areas in Scotland, which are defined so as to identify areas of exceptional scenery and to ensure its protection from inappropriate development by restricting certain forms of development. The Nith Estuary NSA covers 14,337 ha in total, consisting of 14,310 ha of land and intertidal sand and mudflats, as well as a further 28 ha that is below low water. Management of the NSA is the responsibility of Dumfries and Galloway Council, who have produced a management strategy for the area.

Tributaries
Upstream to downstream:
Connel Burn
Afton Water
Kello Water
Crawick Water
Euchan Water
Mennock Water
Carron Water
Cample Water
Scar Water
Shinnel Water
Cluden Water
Cargen Pow
New Abbey Pow

Settlements

Carronbridge
New Cumnock
Kirkconnel
Sanquhar
Mennock
Thornhill
Dumfries
Glencaple

Harbours
Glencaple Quay
Kingholm Quay
Laghall Quay

See also
Dalgarnock Village, Church and Parish

References

External links

Nith Estuary National Scenic Area, South West Scotland Hill Walking Routes

Nith
Nith
 
National scenic areas of Scotland